Dedication is the thirteenth album by American jazz pianist Herbie Hancock. It was recorded in Japan by Hancock alone in 1974 during a Japanese tour.

Background
Hancock performs "Maiden Voyage" and "Dolphin Dance" on piano, while "Nobu" and "Cantaloupe Island" were performed on electric keyboards and synthesizers.

First released on LP by the Japanese CBS/Sony on September 21, 1974, it was not released on CD outside Japan until 2013, first as part of the 34 disc box set The Complete Columbia Album Collection 1972–1988. It was given an individual reissue in 2014 by Wounded Bird Records.

Track listing
All compositions by Herbie Hancock.

Personnel
Herbie Hancock - acoustic piano (#1-2), Fender Rhodes, ARP Pro Soloist, ARP Odyssey, ARP 2600, ARP String Ensemble (#3-4)

References

1974 live albums
Sony Music Entertainment Japan live albums
Herbie Hancock live albums
Albums produced by Dave Rubinson